Joe Kirby is a British school teacher and deputy head at Jane Austen College, who writes on translating research into the classroom. In 2013, he published How To Start on Teach First.

He created and made popular the use of knowledge organisers, a template used by teachers and their students to clarify what is essential to learn. He is a co-founder of Michaela Community School, where he was one of the 20 teaching staff that contributed to the book Battle Hymn of the Tiger Teachers, published in 2016.

Early life and education
Joe Kirby is from Wimbledon, London. After completing an International Baccalaureate, he attended Warwick University where he was elected president of its student's union. In this role, to integrate home and international students, he persuaded Archbishop Desmond Tutu to attend an event at his university. In addition, to raise funds for prostate cancer, he led a team of student volunteers on a hundred-mile walk across Britain.

He has two younger sisters, Juliet and actress Vanessa Kirby. Their mother worked for Country Living and their father is the prostate surgeon Roger Kirby.

Career
Kirby is an English teacher and deputy head who writes on translating research into the classroom. Prior to becoming vice principal at Jane Austen College, part of the Inspiration Trust, Norwich, he was at Dunraven School in Streatham, and then was one of four deputy heads at Michaela Community School in Wembley, a school he helped establish.

He is an active blogger on education, which includes his blog titled "Pragmatic Education". Like a number of other younger British teachers including Tom Bennett and Daisy Christodoulou, Kirby has been inspired by American educator E. D. Hirsch. This has been reflected in his references to Hirsch in a large number of his blogs, popular messages that resulted in promoting Hirsch's's ideas, and increasing Kirby's influence on the debate on education in the UK. In 2013 he was name checked by Michael Gove, British Secretary of State for Education at the time, and the education watchdog Ofsted, and has since been frequently cited and consulted by Gove and politician Nick Gibb.

Teaching methods
Kirby has written on teaching methods with maximum impact and minimum effort. He has advised that hundreds of words can be taught by explaining how words are formed.

At Michaela, he explained that methods were adapted to reduce teacher burnout because "common practices result in heavy workload, high burnout, and very, very high levels of teacher turnover". He rewrote Year 7's study of the Odyssey, removing the parts he felt were less important to read. His 2015 blog post "Marking is a Hornet", which described teachers' marking of homework as "high-effort" and "low-impact" like a hornet, and recommended saving time by asking pupils to self-assess and quiz themselves using checklists or oral feedback. The responsibility, he explains, lies in self-improvement and a collective sense of working for better outcomes. He was one of the 20 members of Michaela's staff that contributed to the book Battle Hymn of the Tiger Teachers, published in 2016 by John Catt Educational, edited by Michaela's head Katharine Birbalsingh and endorsed by Roger Scruton. In the book, Kirby explains the curriculum design and how eleven-year-olds are prepared for school in boot camp prior to the beginning of the school year, how the students are taught that "silence in lessons is golden, that it helps us listen and helps us learn", how teaching of factual knowledge is prioritised, and how consistency and simplicity in a "centralised system" allow students to complete homework with the aim of not overloading teachers with marking, thereby reducing burnout.

Kirby created the knowledge organiser, a template on a single A4 sheet used by teachers and their pupils to clarify what is essential to learn. Usually one sided, it is occasionally two sides of one page. He calls the knowledge organiser “the most powerful tool in the arsenal of the curriculum designer”.

Selected publications

Books
 How to Start on Teach First. Amazon ebook, 2013. (Editor)

Blog posts, opinion pieces, chapters
 "Marking is a hornet". pragmaticreform.wordpress.com 31 October 2015.
 "Knowledge, memory and testing" in Katharine Birbalsingh (Ed.) (2016) Battle Hymn of the Tiger Teachers: The Michaela Way. Melton: John Catt Educational.  
 "The grateful ped(agogue): Why giving thanks may be a gift that gives to the giver". ResearchED. 26 September 2018
 "To sleep, perchance to learn". ResearchED. 28 February 2019.

References

External links 
 Pragmaticreform.wordpress.com. Joe Kirby's blogs
 Bootcamp breaks the bad habits. Michaela Community School's Tiger Teachers event Nov 2016

Schoolteachers from London
People from Wimbledon, London
British bloggers
British writers
Living people
Year of birth missing (living people)
Schoolteachers from Norfolk